Romanesco is an Italian adjective meaning "pertinent to the medieval and modern Roman people".

Romanesco may refer to:

 Romanesco dialect, an Italian dialect spoken in the city of Rome and its surroundings
 Romanesco broccoli, a kind of cauliflower

See also
 Romanesca, a melodic-harmonic formula popular in the 16th and 17th centuries
 Romain (disambiguation)
 Romanesque (disambiguation)
 Romanization (disambiguation)
 Romanza (disambiguation)
 Romano (disambiguation)
 Romana (disambiguation)